This is a list of schools closed by the Detroit Public Schools Community District. There have been about 200 school closures since 2000. Some have been repurposed, while others were torn down, most remain vacant though, although the exact number is unclear. According to Detroiturbex.com, there are 56 abandoned schools to this day, while 36 have been demolished and 2 have been renovated.

High schools

Middle schools 
OW Holmes Elementary/Middle School

Elementary schools

Additional Information of schools
Info of High Schools

In 2011, Chadsey High School was demolished.

In 2016, Detroit City Alternative High School was demolished.

In 2019, Charles Kettering High School was subject to partial demolition.
In 2012, Mackenzie High School was demolished.

In 2005, Northern High School was repurposed.

in 1982, Northeastern high school was demolished.

In 2012, Redford High School was demolished.

In 2023, Southwestern High School was demolished.

Info of Middle Schools'

In 2012, Elizabeth Cleveland Intermediate School was renovated.

See also 
 List of Detroit Public Schools schools

Notes

References

External links
The Decline of Detroit's Neighborhood Schools at MichiganRadio.org
Photo gallery of Detroit's closed schools by Yvette van der Velde

 Closed
Closed public schools
Detroit